RKS Teanoai (301) is a  operated by the Republic of Kiribati Police. Teanoai is one of twenty-two small patrol vessels Australia designed and built for smaller fellow members of the Pacific Forum, after the United Nations Convention on the Law of the Sea extended control of a  exclusive economic zone for all maritime nations.

Teanoai will be replaced by the larger and more capable   in late 2020, postponed to July 2021.

Operational history

In 2006 Teanoai worked with the Greenpeace ship  on fishery patrol.

In February 2018 Teanoai and  performed a joint patrol of their waters. The vessels' crews engaged in boarding exercises, including both Strattons pursuit boat, and her on-board helicopter.

References 

Pacific Forum class patrol vessels
Naval ships of the Kiribati
1994 ships